Tanja Elsner (born 16 January 1993) is a Slovenian professional racing cyclist, who last rode for UCI Women's Team .

See also
 List of 2016 UCI Women's Teams and riders

References

External links
 

1993 births
Living people
Slovenian female cyclists
Sportspeople from Ljubljana